Derbyshire County Cricket Club in 1912 was the cricket season when the English club Derbyshire had been playing for forty one years. It was their eighteenth season in the County Championship and they won two matches to finish tenth in the Championship table.

1912 season
Derbyshire played twenty matches, of which eighteen were in the County Championship and the others against touring South Africans and Australians.  John Chapman was in his third year as captain. In one of the wettest summers on record, no players scored centuries. Samuel Cadman scored most runs, and had one of the team's two innings in the nineties.  Arthur Morton took most wickets.

Significant players who made their debut in the season were Richard Baggallay who went on to captain the side and Geoffrey Jackson whose death in World War I deprived the club of a useful player. New players who had shorter careers were George Burnham and Albert Blount who each played five game in the 1912 season. That was the extent of Burnham's career, but Blount reappeared in one more match fourteen years later.

Matches

{| class="wikitable" width="100%"
! bgcolor="#efefef" colspan=6 | List of matches
|- bgcolor="#efefef"
!No.
!Date
!V
!Result 
!Margin
!Notes
|- 
|1
|4 May 1912
| South Africans   County Ground, Derby 
 |bgcolor="#FF0000"|Lost
| 7 wickets
| A Morton 6–52; Faulkner 5–46 
|- 
|2
|13 May 1912
| Warwickshire Edgbaston, Birmingham 
|bgcolor="#FF0000"|Lost
| Innings and 22 runs
 | Field 5–60 
|- 
|3
|20 May 1912
| Lancashire  Queen's Park, Chesterfield 
|bgcolor="#FFCC00"|Drawn
|
 |  
|- 
|4
|23 May 1912
|  Sussex   County Ground, Hove 
|bgcolor="#FF0000"|Lost
| 8 wickets
 | SWA Cadman 95; AG Slater 5–80; Sims 5–39 
|- 
|5
|27 May 1912
| Essex   County Ground, Leyton 
|bgcolor="#FF0000"|Lost
|Innings and 27 runs
 | Perrin 245; McGahey 150 
|- 
|6
|30 May 1912
| Hampshire County Ground, Southampton 
|bgcolor="#FFCC00"|Drawn
|
 | L Oliver 94; Barrett 119; A Warren 5–129  
|- 
|7
|3 Jun 1912
|  Sussex   County Ground, Derby 
|bgcolor="#FFCC00"|Drawn
|
 | A Morton 5–44; Cox 8–24 
|- 
|8
|6 Jun 1912
| Somerset Recreation Ground, Bath 
|bgcolor="#FFCC00"|Drawn
|
 | Greswell 5–54; A Morton 7–16 
|- 
|9
|13 Jun 1912
| Hampshire County Ground, Derby 
|bgcolor="#FF0000"|Lost
| 54 runs
 | A Morton 6–59; Kenedy 5–26; Newman 5–30; A Warren 6–59; Brown 6–77  
|- 
|10
|20 Jun 1912
| LeicestershireBath Grounds, Ashby-de-la-Zouch 
|bgcolor="#00FF00"|Won
| 83 runs
 | King 6–65; A Warren 7–52 
|- 
|11
|24 Jun 1912
| Warwickshire  County Ground, Derby 
|bgcolor="#FFCC00"|Drawn
|
 |  
|- 
|12
|29 Jun 1912
| Northamptonshire  Queen's Park, Chesterfield 
|bgcolor="#FFCC00"|Drawn
|
 | East 6–58; A Warren 5–31 
|- 
|13
|4 Jul 1912
| Nottinghamshire  Trent Bridge, Nottingham 
|bgcolor="#FF0000"|Lost
| Innings and 147 runs
 | Wass 5–50 and 5–20 
|- 
|14
|15 Jul 1912
| SomersetCounty Ground, Derby 
|bgcolor="#00FF00"|Won
| 133 runs
 | Greswell 8–65; A Warren 5–50 
|- 
|15
|25 Jul 1912
| Leicestershire Queen's Park, Chesterfield 
|bgcolor="#FFCC00"|Drawn
|
 | A Morton 5–73 
|- 
|16
|1 Aug 1912
| Australians  County Ground, Derby  
|bgcolor="#FFCC00"|Drawn
| 
| T Forrester 5–76; Matthews 6–23; A Morton 5–52 
|- 
|17
|5 Aug 1912
| Essex   County Ground, Derby 
|bgcolor="#FFCC00"|Drawn
| 
|  
|- 
|18
|8 Aug 1912
| Lancashire  Old Trafford, Manchester 
|bgcolor="#FF0000"|Lost
| 248 runs
 | Whitehead 100; Makepeace 99; Dean 6–110 and 6–53 
|- 
|19
|17 Aug 1912
| Northamptonshire  County Ground, Northampton 
|bgcolor="#FF0000"|Lost
| 6 wickets
 | Thompson 5–42; T Forrester 7–18; Smith 6–26 
|- 
|20
|26 Aug 1912
 | Nottinghamshire  Miners Welfare Ground, Blackwell 
|bgcolor="#FFCC00"|Drawn
|
| Iremonger 6–38 
|-

Statistics

County Championship batting averages

County Championship bowling averages

Wicket Keepers
Joe Humphries Catches 24, Stumping 7 
G Beet Catches 3, Stumping 1

See also
Derbyshire County Cricket Club seasons
1912 English cricket season

References

1912 in English cricket
Derbyshire County Cricket Club seasons
English cricket seasons in the 20th century